Ossoff is a surname. Notable people with the surname include:

Jon Ossoff (born 1987), American politician
Robert H. Ossoff, American physician-scientist and otolaryngologist